The Security Council of Belarus (Belarusian: Савет бяспекі Рэспублікі Беларусь, Russian: Совет безопасности Республики Беларусь) is an interdepartmental body with a mandate to ensure the security of the Republic of Belarus. It considers internal and external affairs of the state with regard to the interest of maintaining security and defense. The Council was established upon the adoption of Resolution +1249 on 15 November 1991. The current Secretary of the Council is Alexander Volfovich.

History
It was established on November 15, 1991, when the Supreme Soviet of Belarus approved decision No. 1249, which established a 14 member Security Council, which included the then Commander of the Belarusian Military District. In accordance with the 1994 Belarusian Constitution, the chairman of the council was the President of Belarus, in their position as head of state and Commander-in-chief. In 1997, the Security Council apparatus, headed by the State Secretary, was renamed to the secretariat.

Powers 
Security Council's powers include:

 Submitting proposals to the President regarding domestic and foreign policies
 Coordinate activities of government authorities 
 Put forward early solutions to prevent emergency situations

Increased powers 

In April 2021, President Lukashenko announced intentions to amend existing statutes for the emergency transfer of presidential power, making the Security Council the collective head of state should the President be killed. The Prime Minister would head the security council in place of the president. He signed the decree on 9 May, after the Victory Day celebrations. Justifying the decision, he noted that two-thirds of the council are civilians.

Composition of members
It is currently composed of 20 people: 

President of Belarus
Prime Minister of Belarus 
Chairman of the House of Representatives
Chairman of the Council of the Republic 
Chairman of the Supreme Court
Head of the Presidential Administration of Belarus
State Secretary
Prosecutor General
Chairman of the National Bank 
Chairman of the State Security Committee of the Republic of Belarus
Minister of Defense
Minister of Foreign Affairs
Minister of Internal Affairs 
Minister of Emergency Situations
Chairman of the Investigation 
Chief of the General Staff

Viktor Lukashenko, the senior son of President Alexander Lukashenko, is also a member of the council (since January 2007), being the National Security Advisor.

State Secretaries 
 Viktor Sheiman (1994—November 27, 2000)
 Ural Latypov (November 27, 2000—September 12, 2001)
 Gennady Nevyglas (September 12, 2001—July 15, 2008)
 Yuri Zhadobin (July 15, 2008—December 4, 2009)
 Leonid Maltsev (December 4, 2009—December 5, 2013)
 Alexander Mezhuyev (December 5, 2013—November 4, 2015)
 Stanislav Zas (November 4, 2015—January 20, 2020)
 Andrei Ravkov (January 20-September 3, 2020)
 Valery Vakulchik (September 3, 2020—October 29, 2020)
 Alexander Volfovich (since January 26, 2021)

References

Government of Belarus
Belarus
1991 establishments in Belarus
Military of Belarus